Rationaltheater is a theater in Munich, Bavaria, Germany. 

Theatres in Munich